All American Bank Building is a historic bank building located at South Bend, St. Joseph County, Indiana. It was built in 1924, and is a four-story, Classical Revival style Indiana limestone building.  It was designed by Chicago architects Vitzthum & Burns.  The first floor has large round-arched openings, above which are Corinthian order pilasters that separate a continuous series of windows.  The All American Bank occupied the building until 1970.

It was listed on the National Register of Historic Places in 1985.

References

Bank buildings on the National Register of Historic Places in Indiana
Neoclassical architecture in Indiana
Commercial buildings completed in 1924
Buildings and structures in South Bend, Indiana
National Register of Historic Places in St. Joseph County, Indiana